See See the Sun is the first album by the Dutch progressive rock band Kayak. It was originally released by Harvest Records in 1973 and reissued by Pseudonym with two bonus tracks (both of which were originally singles b-sides) in 1995, and again in 2012.

The song 'Mammoth' is one of the very few pop singles to feature a barrel organ (or street organ). The organ, The Flamingo, was too big to get through the studio entrance. Therefore, the melody was recorded outside. Being a manually operated organ, the pace varied all the time, making it very hard to fit the piece into the rest of the song.

Track listing 

 "Reason for it All" (Scherpenzeel) – 6:29
 "Lyrics" (Scherpenzeel) – 3:42
 "Mouldy Wood" (Slager/Koopman/Scherpenzeel) – 5:16
 "Lovely Luna" (Koopman) – 8:19
 "Hope for a Life" (Koopman/Scherpenzeel) – 6:49
 "Ballet of the Cripple" (Van Leeuwen/Koopman/Scherpenzeel) – 4:39
 "Forever is a Lonely Thought" (Koopman/Scherpenzeel) – 5:26
 "Mammoth" (Koopman/Scherpenzeel) – 2:57
 "See See the Sun" (Van Leeuwen/Koopman/Scherpenzeel) – 4:13

Bonus tracks (1995 reissue)

 "Still Try to Write a Book" (Koopman) – 2:01
 "Give it a Name" (Van Leeuwen/Koopman/Scherpenzeel) – 2:44

Lineup
 Max Werner – lead vocals, percussion, Mellotron
 Johan Slager – guitars, backing vocals
 Ton Scherpenzeel – keyboards, backing vocals
 Cees van Leeuwen – bass, backing vocals, harmonica
 Pim Koopman – drums, backing vocals, synthesizer, marimba, lead vocals on "Lovely Luna," "Forever Is a Lonely Thought," and "Give It a Name"

Guest appearances
 Giny Bush and Martine Koeman – violins on "Lyrics"
 Ernst Reijseger – cello on "Lyrics"
 Gerrit-Jan Leenders – vocals, percussion on "Hope for a Life"
 Rijn Peter de Klerk – percussion on "Hope for a Life"
 G. Perlee – barrel organ "Flamingo" Amsterdam on "Mammoth"

References

External links
Album review

Kayak (band) albums
1973 albums
Harvest Records albums